Wright Island is a  island in Encounter Bay, South Australia. It is located between the popular tourist destination Granite Island and the prominent rocky headland known as The Bluff. The island consists largely of granite boulders. It also features low vegetation and a sandy beach suitable for the landing of small boats. The island is uninhabited and can only be accessed from the water. It was named after William Wright, one of the headmen of the South Australia Company's whaling operations in the Victor Harbor area in the 1800s.  The island is managed by the City of Victor Harbor, the local government authority, as part of its  parks and gardens asset.

Eleven-year-old Janet Barker visited the island in 1954 and described it in a letter to Adelaide newspaper, The Mail:

Wright Island Beach 

Wright Island Beach (35°34'55.45"S 138°36'29.24"E) is a small beach located on Wright Island. It is commonly used by wildlife and is popular with human visitors in the summer who swim and fish there.

Little penguin colony 
"Many" penguins were present on Wright Island in 1941 and breeding in 1954. 

In 1973, ten dead penguins and fifteen young seagulls were found dead on Wright Island in Encounter Bay, South Australia. It was believed that they were killed by people poking sticks down burrows before scattering the dead bodies around.

In 1977, Wright Island supported a colony of 300 Little penguins.

In 1990, the wider Encounter Bay population (of which Wright Island is a part) was estimated to be between 5000 and 7000 penguins.

In early December 1991 a general count found 447 penguins present. In 1992, the population was estimated at over 200. At June 2011 its population status was unknown.

In January 2013, Victor Harbor mayor Graham Philp said that the penguin colonies on Wright and West Islands were 'extinct' while the population on Granite Island was in 'the low 20s'.

The 2013 Encounter Bay penguin census conducted by penguin ecologist Dr. Diane Colombelli-Négrel from Flinders University found no penguins and no active burrows on Wright Island. The census' report concluded that the colony had not recovered from a prior colony collapse.

References 

Islands of South Australia
Encounter Bay
Uninhabited islands of Australia